The study of mental health in the Middle East is an area of research that continues to grow in its scope and content. In 1998, the World Mental Health Survey Initiative was conducted by the World Federation for Mental Health. The (WFMH) was originally created in 1948 and works in concert with the World Health Organization (WHO).  The 1998 survey sought to help define and clarify mental health Issues across many societies.

To accurately evaluate and understand the mental health issues of the Middle East, one must take into account the geographic, historical, cultural, and social influences of that part of the world.  While each of the many countries commonly considered part of the "Middle East" is unique, there is a binding ethnic fabric that should be considered.  Firstly, the Middle East is the origin of many of the major world religions. Christianity, Judaism  and Islam, all began in this region.  Of these many religions, Islam has had the most lasting and culturally significant influence on the region, encompassing well over ninety percent (90%) of the population by some measurements.  The tenets of the Islamic faith, and its strict purpose, certainly have served as both a guide and a hindrance to the practices' of mental health care providers in the Middle East.  There is a conflict between ancient religious teachings and the modern day or "Western world" approach to the issues of mental health.

Historical perspective

Mental health in the Middle East, from Pharaonic times through to the Islamic Renaissance, has a rich and complex history. During Pharaonic times, soma and psyche were terms used to define mental disorders, and such disorders were described as problems of the heart or uterus, as stated in Eber's and Kahoun's Papyri. While mystical culture predominated at that time, mental disorders were treated on a somatic basis. In the Islamic era, those with mental illness were not known to have endured any forms of torture, nor were they ostracized; this was due to the belief that possession by a good Muslim genie was possible. The first mental hospital in Europe was located in Spain, as discussed by author Paul Ghalioungui, following the Moorish invasions. Mental hospitals then expanded to other European countries. The occurrence of anxiety, schizophrenia, depression, suicide, conversion disorders, and obsessive compulsive disorders had been reported, and these disorders were treated with some success.

Morality and culture most likely arose from a collective choice of communal decisions to provide an accepted structure of communal living. Geography, tradition, and the specific environment may have been most influential in these decisions. The development or evolution of a social milieu integrated with the culmination of culture. Cultural morality has provided a way of managing conflict within a societal group.  Cultural morality and the required behaviors that are cooperative in nature and a cognizance of others within the group, ostracized unhealthy behaviors, and therefore encouraged emotions and actions beneficial to society.  These realized constructs provided an outlet and model of motivations and accepted actions within a social group.
In a 1992 study, Schwartz, Roccas and Sagiv evaluated how priorities are displayed and altered by a "social experience", and how those priorities affect "behavioral orientation and choices". The study surmised that the majority of cultures prioritize some of ten particular value types: self-determination, stimulation, hedonism, achievement, power, security, conformity, tradition, benevolence, and universalism. Among these there were values that cultures prioritize to varying degrees.

Schwartz used these findings in developing his theory of specific types of values, allowing varying cultures to be contrasted with one another. Data was collected from 49 countries and applied to a construct of seven value types. This was done according to the specific priority given by a society to its communal value set. Schwartz selected the seven types of values based on their compatibilities and contradictions to one another. The value types he identified were: "conservatism vs. autonomy", "hierarchy vs. egalitarianism", and "mastery vs. harmony". The value types were then used to examine cultures that were closely
related to each other. The theory is based on cultural dimensions so that conclusions can be defined to a degree, while accounting for the entire social matrix.  This theory has helped researchers to assess the cultural implications of values on regional cultures.  The research also found a correlation between geographical proximity and shared cultural values. Schwartz attributed these relationships to the "shared history", religion, level of development, culture contact, and other factors".

Known syndromes

Zār

Zār (زار) known as possession by a spirit, is exhibited by some Middle Eastern cultures.  Specific ceremonies are performed to placate the zār and relieve the symptoms of the afflicted individual. These ritualized ceremonies, organized and facilitated by a leader, include the affected individual and a person previously affected by the zār, and involve "incense, music, and movement". The details of the ceremony vary by region.  Some leaders may recommend that the patient first seek the help of a doctor, while others believe that interventions by the doctor, such as using needles for injections, may further agitate the zār, creating more problems for the patient.  Those who choose traditional treatment for zār remain in isolation for up to seven days. This syndrome has been reported in North African and Middle Eastern countries, including Ethiopia, Egypt, Iran, and Sudan. Signs and symptoms of zār may include dissociative episodes, unexpected laughing, yelling, or singing, or even patients hitting their heads against a wall. Clients may exhibit apathy and be reclusive.  Those under the influence of the zār may refuse to eat or carry out activities of daily living, and may develop an extended interaction with the possessing spirit.

The evil eye

The "evil eye" is also known as ʿayn al-ḥasūd (عين الحسود)" and "Mal De Ojo", and has been described by a number of sources. It is also described in Mexican culture The late Professor Alan Dundes theorized that belief in the evil eye had a Middle Eastern, Mediterranean, and Indo European pattern of distribution, and was completely unknown in the Americas, Pacific Islands, Asia, and sub-Saharan Africa until the introduction of European and possibly Moorish culture.  He based his ideas upon the ancient underlying belief that water represented life and dryness represented death. Dundes suggested that evil caused by the evil eye came from its power to cause living beings to "dry up", specifically referring to infants, lactating mammals, and even young fruit trees.  Symptoms included sudden vomiting, diarrhea, and loss of potency in men. Dundes contended that the evil eye dries up liquids, which explained its Middle Eastern and desert origins. This unique syndrome is also mentioned in the DSM-IV TR, Appendix I.  The syndrome is also seen in many other Middle Eastern Countries.

Post-traumatic stress disorder
Post-traumatic stress disorder (PTSD) is, unfortunately, common in the Middle East due to the myriad conflicts experienced by people in the region. Diagnostic symptoms for PTSD include recurrent experiencing of the  initial traumatic event(s) through flashbacks or recurrent night sweats and nightmares. Those afflicted with post-traumatic stress syndrome often seek to avoid others as well as any stimulus similar to the traumatic occurrence.  They may also exhibit increased arousal. Difficulty in falling or staying asleep, unexpected episodic fits of anger, and hypervigilance may also occur. The formal diagnostic criteria for both the DSM-IV-TR and ICD-10) indicate that symptoms last for more than one month and cause significant impairment in social, occupational, and/or other important areas of functioning. There is also some evidence that children suffering from PTSD in the Middle East may experience accelerated aging.

Depression

Depression in the Middle East has been specifically studied at Namazi Hospital Shiraz, in Iran.  In a 2006 study of nurses, depressive symptoms were seen in 26.9% of the individuals studied.  In this cross-sectional survey, the rate of depression in 130 nurses was investigated using the 21-item Beck Depression Inventory.  Data collection also involved individual interviews and follow-up by the research team.

See also
 Cross-cultural psychiatry
 Cultural competence
 Culture-bound syndrome
 Ethnocultural empathy
 Global mental health
 Mental health in China
 Mental health in Lebanon
 Mental health in Southeast Africa

References

Sources
 
 
 
 Blainey, Geoffrey (1984), All For Australia, Methuen Haynes, North Ryde, New South Wales, 
 Conflict behind rise in mental health disorders in Somalia, Middle East Online, IRIN, 2010-06-04

 Clancy, Greg (2006), The Conspiracies of Multiculturalism, Sunda Publications, Gordon, New South Wales. 
  Pdf.
 Definition of Society from the OED.
 Hirst, John (2005), Sense and Nonsense in Australian History, Black Inc. Agenda, Melbourne, Victoria. 
 
 Lecture notes on "Defining Society" Retrieved From: East Carolina University.
 
 
 Press Release Mental health needs outweigh resources in Middle East: World Federation for Mental Health 2008 report encourages advocacy for World Mental Health Day, Jamie Read, TBWA/RAAD/PR, Rima Maalouf, C.C.M., Eli Lilly, 10 October 2008
 
 Open Directory Project(DMOZ) Middle Eastern Mental Health
 Paniagua, Cuéllar, I., "Multicultural Mental Health," Edited by FA. San Diego, Academic Press, 2000, pp. 225–248
 
 
 
  
 
  Pdf.
  Details.
World Federation for Mental Health - Official website
World Fellowship for Schizophrenia and Allied Disorders - 'Information for families caring for people with mental illness'
 
 
See also:

External links

American Psychiatric Association
Journal of Arabic and Islamic Studies
Journal of Clinical Psychiatry
E-Psychiatry Blog
Early Intervention in Psychiatry
Early Psychosis Association
Middle East Institute
Middle East Studies Association
Psychiatry and Clinical Neurosciences,
The Royal College of Psychiatrists
World Psychiatric Association

Demographics of the Middle East
Mental health by country
Health in Asia